Glen Gann "Buck" Varner (August 17, 1930 – April 29, 2000) was an American professional baseball player. The outfielder, a native of Hixson, Tennessee, appeared in two Major League games for the Washington Senators during the 1952 season.

Varner's Major League trial came at the end of the 1952 minor league season, when he batted .290 with four home runs with Washington's Double-A farm club, the Chattanooga Lookouts. On September 19, he started in left field at Griffith Stadium against the Boston Red Sox, and was hitless in four plate appearances, with a base on balls, against Sid Hudson. Four days later, as a pinch hitter, he grounded out against venerable Philadelphia Athletics pitcher Bobo Newsom.

The ,  Varner batted left-handed and threw right-handed.  He batted .277 in six minor league seasons (1948–1950; 1952–1954), missing the 1951 campaign due to service in the Korean War.

References

External links

1930 births
2000 deaths
Baseball players from Tennessee
Carrollton Hornets players
Charlotte Hornets (baseball) players
Chattanooga Lookouts players
Emporia Nationals players
Major League Baseball outfielders
Orlando Senators players
Washington Senators (1901–1960) players
People from Hamilton County, Tennessee